Slovinci is a village in central Croatia, in the municipality of Sunja, Sisak-Moslavina County. It is located in the Banija region.

History

Demographics
According to the 2011 census, the village of Slovinci has 152 inhabitants. This represents 32.97% of its pre-war population.

According to the 1991 census, 84.82% of the village population were ethnic Serbs (391/461), 7.81% were ethnic Croats (36/461), 0.86% were Yugoslavs (4/461), and 6.51% were of other ethnicity( 30/461).

Notable natives and residents

References 

Populated places in Sisak-Moslavina County
Serb communities in Croatia